Gerhard Füssmann (17 December 1928 – 13 November 1993) was a German rower. He competed in the men's double sculls event at the 1952 Summer Olympics.

References

External links
 

1928 births
1993 deaths
German male rowers
Olympic rowers of Germany
Rowers at the 1952 Summer Olympics
Sportspeople from Bamberg